Lotongus is a genus of grass skippers in the family Hesperiidae. The genus is confined to the Indomalayan realm.

Species
Lotongus calathus (Hewitson, 1876) Burma to Malaya
L. c. calathus Thailand, Langkawi, Malaysia, Tioman, Borneo, Sumatra, Bangka, Natuna, Palawan
L. c. taprobanus (Plötz, 1885)  Celebes
L. c. balta Evans, 1949 Vietnam, Burma, Thailand, Laos
Lotongus saralus (de Nicéville, 1889) Assam to W.China. 
L. s. chinensis Evans, 1932 Burma, Thailand, Laos, N.Vietnam, Szechwan
L. s. quinquepunctus Joicey & Talbot, 1921 Hainan
Lotongus sarala

Former species
Lotongus avesta (Hewitson, 1868) - transferred to Avestia avesta (Hewitson, 1868)

References
Natural History Museum Lepidoptera genus database
Funet

Hesperiinae
Hesperiidae genera